() is a stony asteroid on a highly eccentric orbit, classified as near-Earth object and potentially hazardous asteroid of the Apollo group, approximately  in diameter. It was discovered on 25 August 1998, by astronomers of the LINEAR program at Lincoln Laboratory's Experimental Test Site near Socorro, New Mexico, in the United States. This asteroid is one of the largest potentially hazardous asteroid known to exist.

Orbit and classification 

 is a member of the dynamical Apollo group, which are Earth-crossing asteroids. Apollo asteroids are the largest subgroup of near-Earth objects. It orbits the Sun at a distance of 0.31–4.1 AU once every 3 years and 3 months (1,194 days; semi-major axis of 2.20 AU). Its orbit has an exceptionally high eccentricity of 0.86 and an inclination of 18° with respect to the ecliptic.

The body's observation arc begins with a precovery taken at the Siding Spring Observatory in June 1983, more than 15 years prior to its official discovery observation at Socorro.

Close approaches 

With an absolute magnitude of 14.3,  is one of the brightest and largest known potentially hazardous asteroid (see PHA-list). Its eccentric orbit leads to close approaches with Mercury and Venus and carries it beyond the asteroid belt but not as far as to the orbit of Jupiter (>4.9 AU). It is therefore also a Venus- and Mars-crossing asteroid.

Physical characteristics 

In the SMASS classification,  is a Sq-subtype, that transitions between the stony S- and Q-type asteroids. Observers at the NASA Infrared Telescope Facility have also characterized this body as an Sr-type, which transitions to the rare R-type asteroids.

Rotation period 

Lightcurve analysis gave a rotation period of 5.789 and 5.8 hours with a brightness amplitude of 0.24 and 1.4 magnitude, respectively. An alternative period solution of 2.9 hours – or half of the above period – is also possible, though considered less likely by Warner.

Diameter and albedo 

 has not been observed by any of the space-based surveys such as IRAS, Akari or the Wide-field Infrared Survey Explorer. The Collaborative Asteroid Lightcurve Link assumes a stony standard albedo of 0.20 for its surface, and calculates a diameter of 4.10 kilometers based on an absolute magnitude of 14.3.

Numbering and naming 

This minor planet was numbered by the Minor Planet Center on 13 September 2000. As of 2018, it has not been named.

Notes

References

External links 
 Asteroid Lightcurve Database (LCDB), query form (info )
 Dictionary of Minor Planet Names, Google books
 Asteroids and comets rotation curves, CdR – Observatoire de Genève, Raoul Behrend
 
 
 

016960
016960
016960
016960
016960
19980825